The University Hospitals Bristol and Weston NHS Foundation Trust is a National Health Service foundation trust in Bristol and Weston-super-Mare, England. The trust runs Bristol Royal Infirmary, Bristol Heart Institute, Bristol Royal Hospital for Children, Bristol Eye Hospital, South Bristol Community Hospital, Bristol Haematology and Oncology Centre, St Michael's Hospital, University of Bristol Dental Hospital and, since 1 April 2020, Weston General Hospital.

Leadership
Eugine Yafele, a former mental health nurse, was appointed chief executive in 2022, moving from the same positions at Dorset HealthCare University NHS Foundation Trust. He topped the ranking of the Health Service Journal's rating of NHS chief executives

Performance
The trust did well in the 2014 cancer patient experience survey and agreed to pair with South Tees Hospitals NHS Foundation Trust, which did badly, in a scheme intended to "spread and accelerate innovative practice via peer-to-peer support and learning". In September 2016, the trust was selected by NHS England as one of twelve Global Digital Exemplars.

In March 2017, the Care Quality Commission (CQC) rated the trust as 'outstanding' and praised it for its strong culture of safety. It was the first NHS trust in England to jump from 'requires improvement' to 'outstanding' between two inspections. The CQC's chief inspector of hospitals, Professor Sir Mike Richards, hailed this as a "tremendous achievement".

, the CQC rates the trust as outstanding overall.

Children's heart surgery

The care of children receiving complex cardiac surgical services at the Bristol Royal Infirmary between 1984 and 1995 was the subject of a public enquiry chaired by Professor Ian Kennedy,
The inquiry, which was announced in 1998 and reported in 2001, resulted from whistle-blowing by Dr Stephen Bolsin.

Reconfiguration
The trust agreed in 2011 that breast and urology services would pass to North Bristol during 2012, while in 2013–14 children's services, paediatric burns and neurosciences would transfer from North Bristol to the Trust.

This was formally completed on 1 April 2020.

Hospitals charity 
Bristol & Weston Hospitals Charity (BWHC) fundraises for all hospitals in the trust, to provide additional facilities for patients, their families and staff. It was formerly know as Above & Beyond. BWHC has existed since 1974 and raises around £2M each year, funding a wide variety of projects including equipment, ward refurbishments and additional extras.

In 2009, BWHC raised £850,000 towards the opening of the Bristol Heart Institute.

In 2013, the charity launched the Golden Gift Appeal, which went on to raise £6M. The money was used towards a range of projects at the Bristol Royal Infirmary and Bristol Haematology and Oncology Centre.

The charity’s Funny Bones comedy night in 2018 featured performances from Russell Howard and John Richardson. The night raised £100,000.

Wales 
The trust decided in February 2014 that it would stop undertaking all "non-specialised, elective activity" for Welsh local health boards, unless covered by an existing contract, because of continuing payment issues.

See also
Healthcare in Bristol
Healthcare in Somerset
 List of NHS trusts

References

External links 

 
 University Hospitals Bristol and Weston NHS Foundation Trust on the NHS website
 Inspection reports from the Care Quality Commission